The Islamic Jihad Union (IJU) is a militant Islamist organization founded in 2002 as a splinter group of the Islamic Movement of Uzbekistan (IMU). Headquartered in North Waziristan, a mountainous region of northwest Pakistan, bordering Afghanistan, the group has been affiliated with both Al-Qaeda and the Taliban.

Under its original name Islamic Jihad Group (IJG), the group conducted several attacks in Uzbekistan. In 2007, a large-scale bomb plot in Germany, known as the "Sauerland terror cell", was discovered by German security authorities. In the following years, the group focused on fighting Pakistani forces in the tribal areas, and NATO and Afghan forces in Afghanistan.

Recruits are mainly Turks both from Turkey and the Turkish communities in Western Europe, but also European converts to Islam, particularly in German-speaking countries.

History

Islamic Jihad Group
The IJG was founded in March 2002 as a splinter group from the Islamic Movement of Uzbekistan (IMU), after the movement was effectively tied between those who aimed to join the Global Jihad, and those who wanted to keep pressure and focus on Uzbekistan. Under its initial name Islamic Jihad Group, the new group settled in North Waziristan and took headquarters in Mir Ali.

IJG set off a series of bombs from 28 March to 1 April 2004 in Uzbekistan, killing 47 people, and had terror cells in Kyrgyzstan, Uzbekistan, and Russia. IJG members trained at terror camps in Pakistan and Kazakhstan. The IJG bombed the Israeli and U.S. embassies and the Uzbek Prosecutor-General's Office in Tashkent, Uzbekistan on 30 July 2004, saying they targeted "apostate" governments. Several IJG members were arrested in Kazakhstan in late 2004.

U.S. Central Intelligence Agency Director Porter Goss testified in March 2005 that IJG "has become a more virulent threat to U.S. interests and local governments." The State Department designated IJG as a global terrorist organization in May 2005. The United Nations Security Council added IJG to its terrorism list in June 2005.

al-Qaida affiliation
In May 2005, the group changed its name into Islamic Jihad Union (IJU). After this period, it became closer to core al-Qaida, shifting its focus towards plotting terror attacks in Pakistan and Western Europe, particularly Germany.

On 13 October 2005, Hazel Blears MP testified before the House of Commons that the IJU should be identified as a banned organization because it posed a threat to British interests overseas. Though some Ministers dissented from this viewpoint, Blears asserted in her testimony that these conclusions were independently corroborated by British intelligence service and security service sources, and that many UN members expressed concern regarding the IJG.

Sauerland-Gruppe

In 2007 three terrorists were arrested in Germany after being suspected of plans to attack the Frankfurt International airport and US-Military installations such as Ramstein Air Base. The three persons were directly affiliated with the Islamic Jihad Group.

In 2008 two suspected IJU members were arrested at Germany's Cologne Bonn Airport aboard a KLM flight bound for Amsterdam. The men, who had connecting flights to Uganda, were thought to have continuing itineraries on to Pakistan, where sources claimed they would participate in some sort of terrorist training or indoctrination.  However, after being held for several days, evidence failed to materialize and the men (one Somali and one German citizen of Somali heritage) were released.

Reorientation to Afghanistan
Following the discovered bombing plot of the IJU-affiliated "Sauerland terror cell" in Germany, the group shifted its operations again to Afghanistan, where in early 2008 a German-born Turkish IJU member drove a VBIED into a NATO compound, killing at least four people.

A video released online by the IJU's media arm, Badr al-Tawhid, in 2011, showed its members fighting alongside Taliban forces in Afghanistan's northern and eastern provinces, and providing training to local Uzbek, Tajik and Pashtuns. The same video listed IJU fighters killed in Afghanistan, whose names indicated they had come from Turkey, Azerbaijan, Uzbekistan, Kazakhstan, and Pakistan.

In a mid-2015 statement, the IJU website claimed that the group was currently fighting alongside the Taliban, al Qaeda, and the Turkistan Islamic Party in southern Afghanistan, the eastern provinces of Paktika, Paktia, and Nangarhar, and the northern provinces of Badakhshan and Kunduz. In August 2015, the IJU released a statement and photos showing scores of its fighters in Northern Afghanistan pledging allegiance to the newly appointed Taliban leader Akhtar Mansoor.

Islamic Jihad Union and Imam Bukhari Jamaat are both in Afghanistan in addition to being allied with Al-Qaeda. Taliban (Islamic Emirate) works with the Islamic Jihad Union.

Participation in the Syrian civil war

In July 2019, according to a report from the United Nations Security Council, the Islamic Jihad Union has operated in Syria, under the control of the Syrian jihadist group Hayat Tahrir al-Sham.

References

Literature
 
Einar Wigen (2009) Islamic Jihad Union: al-Qaida’s Key to the Turkic World? FFI-report 2009/00687
"Islamic Jihad Group's Links with Uzbekistani Terrorism Mulled," Viktoriya Panfilova, April 19, 2004, Moscow, Nezavisimaya Gazeta
"Islamic Jihad Group in Uzbekistan Claims Responsibility for Suicide Attacks," FBIS, July 30, 2004
"U.S. Department of State Designates the Islamic Jihad Group Under Executive Order 13224," Press Statement: Richard Boucher, May 26, 2005, US Department of State
"Country Reports on Terrorism 2005," April 28, 2006, U.S. Department of State

External links
 Official website

 
Terrorism in Central Asia
Jihadist groups
Organisations designated as terrorist by Pakistan
Organisations designated as terrorist by the United Kingdom
Organizations designated as terrorist by the United States
Organizations based in Asia designated as terrorist
Islamic terrorism in Germany
Groups affiliated with al-Qaeda
Islamism in Uzbekistan
Islamic Movement of Uzbekistan
Anti-government factions of the Syrian civil war
Paramilitary organizations based in Syria